Remember This Date is an American game show that aired on NBC from November 14, 1950 to June 28, 1951. The program is most notable for being the first daytime game show.

Game play
The program featured contestants answering questions about events and people connected with the date of the program's broadcast.

References

External link
Remember this Date on IMDb

1950 American television series debuts
1951 American television series endings
1950s American game shows
NBC original programming
Black-and-white American television shows